Pablo García (born 3 February 1946) is a Cuban former basketball player who competed in the 1968 Summer Olympics.

References

1946 births
Living people
Cuban men's basketball players
Olympic basketball players of Cuba
Basketball players at the 1968 Summer Olympics
Basketball players at the 1971 Pan American Games
Pan American Games bronze medalists for Cuba
Pan American Games medalists in basketball
Medalists at the 1971 Pan American Games